Andriy Toptun or Andrii Toptun (born 31 December 1980) is a Ukrainian marathon runner. He has won the Moscow Marathon, Philadelphia Marathon, Regensburg Marathon and Nürburgring-Lauf. He has also been runner-up at the Düsseldorf Marathon, California International Marathon, and the Moscow International Peace Marathon. He has represented Ukraine three times at the European Mountain Running Championships.

He won the 2008 Green Bay Marathon, finishing with the time of 2:22:51.

International competitions

References

External links

1980 births
Living people
Ukrainian male marathon runners
Ukrainian male long-distance runners